"North Wind" is a song written by Rod Morris and originally recorded and released as a single (Imperial 45–8208, c/w "Darlin' Don't Cry") by Slim Whitman.

Track listing

Charts

References 

1953 songs
1953 singles
Imperial Records singles
London Records singles
Slim Whitman songs